Michigan Central Railroad Engine Repair Shops, also known as the Tonn and Blank Building, was a historic railroad engine repair building located at Michigan City, LaPorte County, Indiana.  It was built in 1851–1852 by the Michigan Central Railroad.  It was constructed of Joliet limestone and measured 255 feet long and 62 feet wide. It has been demolished.

It was listed on the National Register of Historic Places in 1975 and delisted in 1978.

References

Former National Register of Historic Places in Indiana
Michigan city
Buildings and structures completed in 1852
Transportation buildings and structures in LaPorte County, Indiana
National Register of Historic Places in LaPorte County, Indiana
1852 establishments in Indiana
Former railway stations in Indiana
Demolished railway stations in the United States